Massis (in Armenian Մասիս) is bilingual (published in Armenian and English) since 1980. The weekly newspaper is headquartered in Pasadena, California.

Massis is the organ of the Social Democrat Hunchakian Party's Western US region.

External links
Massis Weekly website

Weekly newspapers published in California
Armenian-American culture in California
Armenian-language newspapers
Publications established in 1980
Bilingual newspapers
Mass media in Pasadena, California
Social Democrat Hunchakian Party